The Sketch Book of Geoffrey Crayon, Gent., commonly referred to as The Sketch Book, is a collection of 34 essays and short stories written by the American author Washington Irving. It was published serially throughout 1819 and 1820. The collection includes two of Irving's best-known stories, attributed to the fictional Dutch historian Diedrich Knickerbocker: "The Legend of Sleepy Hollow" and "Rip Van Winkle". It also marks Irving's first use of the pseudonym Geoffrey Crayon, which he would continue to employ throughout his literary career.

The Sketch Book, along with James Fenimore Cooper's Leatherstocking Tales, was among the first widely read works of American literature in Britain and Europe. It also helped advance the reputation of American writers with an international audience.

Overview

Apart from "Rip Van Winkle" and "The Legend of Sleepy Hollow" the pieces which made both Irving and The Sketch Book famous the collection of tales includes "Roscoe", "The Broken Heart", "The Art of Book-making", "A Royal Poet", "The Spectre Bridegroom", "Westminster Abbey", "Little Britain", and "John Bull". Irving's stories were highly influenced by German folktales, with "The Legend of Sleepy Hollow" being inspired by a folktale retold by J. K. A. Musäus.

Stories range from the maudlin (such as "The Wife" and "The Widow and Her Son") to the picaresque ("Little Britain") and the comical ("The Mutability of Literature"), but the common thread running through The Sketch Book and a key part of its attraction to readers is the personality of Irving's pseudonymous narrator, Geoffrey Crayon. Erudite, charming, and never one to make himself more interesting than his tales, Crayon holds The Sketch Book together through the sheer power of his personality and Irving would, for the rest of his life, seamlessly enmesh Crayon's persona with his own public reputation.

Little more than five of the 33 chapters deal with American subjects: the essays "English Writers on America", "The Traits of Indian Character", "Philip of Pokanoket: An Indian Memoir", and parts of "The Author's Account of Himself" and "The Angler"; and Knickerbocker's short stories "Rip Van Winkle" and "The Legend of Sleepy Hollow". Most of the remainder of the book consists of vignettes of English life and landscape, written with the author's characteristic charm while he lived in England. Irving wrote in a preface for a later edition:

Background
Irving began writing the tales that would appear in The Sketch Book shortly after moving to England for the family business, in 1815. When the family business spiraled into bankruptcy throughout 1816 and 1817 a humiliation that Irving never forgot Irving was left with no job and few prospects. He tried at first to serve as an intermediary between American and English publishers, scouting for English books to reprint in America and vice versa, with only marginal success. In the autumn of 1818, his oldest brother William, sitting as a Congressman from New York, secured for him a political appointment as chief clerk to the Secretary of the U.S. Navy, and urged Irving to return home.  Irving demurred, however, choosing to remain in England and take his chances as a writer. As he told friends and family back in the United States:

Irving spent late 1818 and the early part of 1819 putting the final touches on the short stories and essays that he would eventually publish as The Sketch Book through 1819 and 1820.

Contents
The Sketch Book initially existed in two versions: a seven-part serialized American version in paperback and a two-volume British version in hardback. The British edition contained three essays that were not included in the original American serialized format. Two more essays, "A Sunday in London" and "London Antiques", were added by Irving in 1848 for inclusion in the Author's Revised Edition of The Sketch Book for publisher George Putnam. At that time, Irving reordered the essays. Consequently, modern editions based on Irving's own changes for the Author's Revised Edition do not reflect the order in which the sketches originally appeared.

Modern editions of The Sketch Book contain all 34 stories, in the order directed by Irving in his Author's Revised Edition, as follows:

Publishing history

American editions
The first American edition of The Sketch Book initially comprised twenty-nine short stories and essays, published in the United States in seven paperbound installments, appearing intermittently between June 23, 1819, and September 13, 1820.  Irving used his brother Ebenezer and friend Henry Brevoort as his stateside emissaries, mailing packets of each installment to them for final editing and publication. Each installment was published simultaneously in New York, Boston, Baltimore, and Philadelphia by New York publisher C.S. Van Winkle, who would send each installment into a second printing through 1819 and 1820. Under Brevoort's influence, the books were formatted as large octavo editions printed on top-grade paper and utilizing 12-point typefaces instead of the usual 8-point type.

A single-volume hardcover version, reprinting the two English volumes, was published in the United States by Van Winkle in 1824.

Contents of the American installments

First installment (June 23, 1819)
"The Author’s Account of Himself"
"The Voyage"
"Roscoe"
"The Wife"
"Rip Van Winkle"

Second installment (July 31, 1819)
"English Writers on America"
"Rural Life in England"
"The Broken Heart"
"The Art of Book Making"

Third installment (September 13, 1819)
"A Royal Poet"
"The Country Church"
"The Boar’s Head Tavern, East Cheap"
"The Widow and Her Son"

Fourth installment (November 10, 1819)
"The Mutability of Literature"
"Rural Funerals"
"The Inn Kitchen"
"The Spectre Bridegroom"

Fifth installment (January 1, 1820)
"Christmas"
"The Stage Coach"
"Christmas Eve"
"Christmas Day"
"Christmas Dinner"

Sixth installment (March 15, 1820)
"John Bull"
"The Pride of the Village"
"The Legend of Sleepy Hollow"

Seventh installment (September 13, 1820)
"Little Britain"
"Stratford-On-Avon"
"Westminster Abbey"
"The Angler"

English edition
Portions of The Sketch Book were almost immediately reprinted in British literary magazines and with no real international copyright laws to protect American works from being reprinted in England, poached American writers were entitled neither to the profits for their work, nor to legal recourse. Irving was concerned about such literary piracy "I am fearful some [British] Bookseller in the American trade may get hold of [The Sketch Book]," he told his brother in law, "and so run out an edition of it without my adapting it for the London public or participating in the profits." Determined to protect The Sketch Book from further poaching, Irving arranged to secure his British copyright by self-publishing the work in London.

 The first four American installments were collected into a single volume and self-published by Irving in London, under John Miller’s Burlington Arcade imprint, on February 16, 1820. In early April, however, Miller went bankrupt, leaving the bulk of The Sketch Book unsold in his warehouse.

Searching for another publisher, Irving appealed to his friend and mentor, Sir Walter Scott, for assistance.  Scott approached his own publisher, London powerhouse John Murray, and convinced him to purchase the rest of the stock and continue publication. (In gratitude, Irving dedicated the English editions of The Sketch Book to Walter Scott.) Heartened by the enthusiastic response to The Sketch Book, Murray encouraged Irving to publish the remaining three American installments as a second volume as quickly as possible.

In July 1820, Murray published the second volume of The Sketch Book, including all the pieces from the final three American installments, plus three additional essays: the American Indian sketches "Philip of Pokanoket" and "Traits of Indian Character", which Irving had originally written for the Analectic Magazine in 1814, and a short original piece, "L'Envoy", in which Irving thanked his British readers for their indulgence.

Given Irving's additions, the English version of The Sketch Book contained thirty-two pieces, while its American counterpart contained only twenty-nine.

Author's revised edition

In 1848, as part of the Author's Revised Edition he was completing for publisher George Putnam, Irving added two new stories to The Sketch Book "London Antiques" and "A Sunday in London" as well as a new preface and the postscript to "Rip Van Winkle". Irving also slightly changed the order of the sketches, placing a number of essays from the seventh American installment earlier in the collection, and moving "The Legend of Sleepy Hollow" into a place of prominence as the final story in the collection ("L'Envoy" being merely a thank you to readers).

Public and critical response
The first American reviews were the result of well-placed advance publicity, performed on Irving’s behalf by his friend Henry Brevoort. Three days after the book’s release, Brevoort placed an anonymous review in the New-York Evening Post, lauding The Sketch Book and making it clear to readers that it was Irving’s work:

Outside Irving’s immediate circle of friends, the reviews were equally positive.  As critic Gulian Verplanck wrote:

Two of the book's early admirers were Sir Walter Scott (who called it "positively beautiful") and Lord Byron (who said of the book, "I know it by heart"). Years later, poet Henry Wadsworth Longfellow said The Sketch Book was one of the earliest works to excite his interest in literature. As he said, "Every reader has his first book; I mean to say, one book among all others which in early youth first fascinates his imagination, and at once excites and satisfies the desires of his mind... To me, this first book was The Sketch Book of Washington Irving".

Apart from "Rip Van Winkle" and "The Legend of Sleepy Hollow", both of which were immediately acknowledged as The Sketch Book’s finest pieces, American and English readers alike responded most strongly to the more sentimental tales, especially "The Broken Heart", which Byron claimed had made him weep and "The Widow and Her Son".

In Britain, the book did much to promote Americans as legitimate writers, and their work as legitimate literature a concept that surprised English critics. "Everywhere I find in it the marks of a mind of the utmost elegance and refinement," wrote the English historian William Godwin, "a thing as you know that I was not exactly prepared to look for in an American." The English magazine Quarterly Review agreed. "[Irving] seems to have studied our language where alone it can be studied in all its strength and perfection, and in working these precious mines of literature he has refined for himself the ore which there so richly abounds."

Even Irving admitted that he was pleased to have stunned the skeptical English critics.  When one English admirer asked Irving to confirm that he was really an American, Irving responded enthusiastically: "The doubts which her ladyship has heard on the subject seem to have arisen from the old notion that it is impossible for an American to write decent English."

The book is compared favourably with William Pinnock's English educational texts in George Eliot's novel The Mill on the Floss (1860): Maggie, talking about her 'gloomy fancy' to her cousin Lucy says:

"Perhaps it comes from the school diet watery rice-pudding spiced with Pinnock. Let us hope it will give way before my mother's custards and this charming Geoffrey Crayon." Maggie took up the Sketch Book, which lay by her on the table. (Book 6, Chapter 2)

The Sketch Book cemented Irving’s reputation, and propelled him to a level of celebrity previously unseen for an American writer. "I am astonished at the success of my writings in England," Irving wrote to his publisher, "and can hardly persuade myself that it is not all a dream. Byron, I should have as readily believed a fairy tale."

Influence on American culture
The Sketch Book introduced three of Irving's most enduring and iconic characters, Rip Van Winkle, Ichabod Crane, and the Headless Horseman.

One of the most significant influences of The Sketch Book came from its cycle of five Christmas stories, portraying an idealized and old-fashioned Yule celebration at an English country manor. Irving's stories depicted harmonious warm-hearted  English Christmas customs he observed while staying in Aston Hall, Birmingham, England, that had largely been abandoned, and he used the tract Vindication of Christmas (London 1652) of Old English Christmas traditions, that he had transcribed into his journal as a format for his stories. Except Pennsylvania German Settlers, who were enthusiastic celebrators of Christmas, Irving contributed to a revival of customs in the United States. Charles Dickens later credited Irving as an  influence on his own Christmas writings, including the classic A Christmas Carol.

The U.S. Postal Service issued a Legend of Sleepy Hollow postage stamp for use with the 1974 Halloween mail.

References

Bibliography

(4 vols. Cited herein as PMI.)

External links

 
 The Sketch Book of Geoffrey Crayon, Gent. (Author's Revised Edition) as Project Gutenberg ebook #2048
 The Sketch Book at Internet Archive
 
 Publishing history of The Sketch Book
 "Children's Literature" at Microsoft Encarta
 

1819 short story collections
Short story collections by Washington Irving
Works published under a pseudonym
The Legend of Sleepy Hollow
Rip Van Winkle